Étienne-Denis, duc de Pasquier (21 April 17675 July 1862), Chancelier de France, (a title revived for him by Louis-Philippe in 1837),  was a French statesman. In 1842, he was elected a member of the Académie française, and in the same year was created a duke by Louis-Philippe.

Biography
Born in Paris in a family of the noblesse de robe, with ancestors such as Étienne Pasquier, he was destined for the legal profession and was educated at the Collège de Juilly near Paris. He then became a counsellor of the parlement de Paris, and witnessed many of the incidents that marked the growing hostility between that body and Louis XVI of France in the years preceding the French Revolution of 1789.

His views were those of a moderate reformer, determined to preserve the House of Bourbon in a renovated France; his memoirs depict in a favorable light the actions of his  (an institution soon to be abolished towards the end of the year 1789, under growing revolutionary pressures).

For some time, and especially during the Reign of Terror (1793–1794), Pasquier remained in obscurity; but this did not save him from arrest nor his father from execution in the year 1794.  He was incarcerated for two months in the Saint-Lazare Prison shortly before the start of Thermidorian Reaction, and released after the fall and execution of Maximilien Robespierre at the end of July 1794.

Empire
He did not re-enter the public service until the period of the First French Empire, when the arch-chancellor Jean Jacques Régis de Cambacérès used his influence with Napoleon I to procure for him the office of maître des requêtes to the Conseil d'État. In 1809, he became baron of the Empire, and in February 1810 counsellor of State. In October 1810, the Emperor made him prefect of police of Paris.

The main challenge of his career was the strange conspiracy of the republican general Claude François de Malet (October 1812); Malet, spreading false news that Napoleon had died in the Russian campaign, managed to surprise and capture some of the ministers and other authorities in Paris, among them Pasquier. However, the attempt's manifest failure enabled Pasquier to speedily regain his liberty.

Restoration and July Monarchy
When Napoleon abdicated in April 1814, Pasquier continued to exercise his functions for a few days in order to preserve order, and then resigned from the prefecture of police, whereupon Louis XVIII of France allotted to him the Corps des Ponts et Chaussées. He distanced himself from the Imperial restoration at the time of the Hundred Days (1815), and, after the final Bourbon Restoration, became Keeper of the Seal (July 1815). Finding it impossible to work with the Ultra-royalists of the Chamber of Deputies (the Chambre introuvable), he resigned office in September. Under the more moderate ministers of succeeding years, he again held various appointments, but refused to join the reactionary cabinets of the close of the reign of Charles X of France.

After the July Revolution (1830), he became president of the Chamber of Peers a post which he held through the whole of the reign of Louis-Philippe (1830–1848). After the abdication of Louis-Philippe in February 1848, Chancelier Pasquier retired from active life and set to work to compile the notes and reminiscences of his long and active career. He died in Paris at the age of ninety-five on 5 July 1862.

References

Sources
 In turn, it cites as references:
Mémoires du Chancelier Pasquier (6 vols., Paris, 1893–1895; partly translated into English, 4 vols., London, 1893–1894)
L. de Vieilcastel, Histoire de la Restauration, vols. i.iv.

1767 births
1862 deaths
Writers from Paris
Dukes of Pasquier
18th-century French lawyers
French memoirists
Prefects of police of Paris
Members of the Académie Française
People of the French Revolution
Grand Croix of the Légion d'honneur
French interior ministers
Members of the Chamber of Peers of the Bourbon Restoration
Members of the Chamber of Peers of the July Monarchy
French male non-fiction writers
19th-century French lawyers